Secret Society is the seventh studio album by the Swedish rock band Europe. It was released on October 25, 2006, by Sanctuary Records. "We think it's one of the strongest albums that Europe has ever done," vocalist Joey Tempest said, "There is definitely some more melodic stuff on this one. Start from the Dark was very raw and made a statement, which is cool but for us it felt like a debut album in a way, so we wanted to branch out a bit on this one and take it to new levels."

Track listing

Personnel 
Joey Tempest – vocals, acoustic guitars, Pro Tools programming and additional engineering
John Norum – guitars
John Levén – bass
Mic Michaeli – keyboards, Pro Tools programming and additional engineering
Ian Haugland – drums
Archie Lamprell – choir vocals on "Let the Children Play"
Europe – producer
Lennart Östlund – engineer
Stefan Glaumann – mixing
George Marino – mastering
Peer Stappe – logic programming
StormStudios – cover design and photography
Lee Baker – artwork
Dan Abbott – illustrations
Erik Weiss – photography

Chart positions

References 

Europe (band) albums
2006 albums
Sanctuary Records albums
Albums with cover art by Storm Thorgerson